MacLaren Youth Correctional Facility is a correctional facility in unincorporated Marion County, Oregon, United States, near Woodburn.

References

External links
 MacLaren Youth Correctional Facility official site

Prisons in Oregon
Woodburn, Oregon
Education in Oregon
Juvenile detention centers in the United States
Buildings and structures in Marion County, Oregon